Kareh Pa (also Romanized as Kareh Pā, Koreh Pā, Korreh Pā, and Kurreh Pa; also known as Khowreh) is a village in Hendijan-e Sharqi Rural District, in the Central District of Hendijan County, Khuzestan Province, Iran. At the 2006 census, its population was 227, in 46 families.

References 

Populated places in Hendijan County